Living with Crazy Buttocks is a book written by Australian author and cartoonist Kaz Cooke and published by Penguin Books on November 19, 2001. It won the 2002 Bookseller/Diagram Prize for Oddest Title of the Year.

Synopsis

Living with Crazy Buttocks is composed of humorous essays on contemporary culture, with author Kaz Cooke exploring topics ranging from Barbie dolls, the National Aeronautics and Space Administration, celebrities, firemen, archbishops, cosmetic surgery, Internet gurus, Ricky Martin's bottom, Barbara Cartland to Ben-Hur.

References

Australian non-fiction books
2001 non-fiction books
Penguin Books books